Colossamite was an American math rock band based in Minneapolis, Minnesota. They were one of the most prominent exponents of the genre. 

Colossamite's members included Nick Sakes (vocals, electric guitar), Ed Rodriguez (electric guitar), John Dieterich (electric guitar), and Chad Popple (drum set); the group had no bass player.  All except Sakes were transplanted Wisconsinites.

Like similar groups such as Zeni Geva, Craw, U.S. Maple, or Dazzling Killmen (this last group for which Sakes sang before relocating to Minnesota) Colossamite's music was almost hyperbolically brutal, chaotic, and rhythmically and formally complex.  Rather than relying, as most heavy metal bands, on guitar distortion to produce an intense sound, Colossamite instead often relied on very loud "clean" (undistorted) guitars, played dissonantly, in conjunction with vocals that were screamed rather than sung.  Songs featured jarring shifts in tempo and mood, with the overall sound being extremely raw, heavy and often slow.

Colossamite released three recordings on the Chicago-based Skin Graft Records and one split CD on Italy's Freeland Records.  The group, however, did not last long, perhaps because the extreme and uncompromising nature of its music (as with much contemporary classical music, which incidentally Colossamite's music resembles) was appreciated mainly by a niche audience, thus proving fairly uncommercial.

The group disbanded in 1998. Three of the four members now play in the experimental rock band Gorge Trio, based in Oakland, California.

Discography
1997 - All Lingo's Clamor EP (Skin Graft)
1998 - Gust's of Lead split 7-inch with White Tornado (Skin Graft)
1998 - Economy of Motion (Skin Graft)
1998 - Frisbee EP - came with a Colossamite frisbee (aka Camera Within EP, Skin Graft)

References

External links
 Colossamite page at Southern Records site
Colossomite photos from Skin Graft Records site]
Colossamite page
Interview about Colossamite (2003)
[ AllMusic entry for Colossamite]

Listening
Colossamite audio samples

Musical groups disestablished in 1998
Math rock groups
Rock music groups from Minnesota